Turner is a village in Arenac County of the U.S. state of Michigan.  The population was 114 at the 2010 census, which ranks Turner as the least-populated village in the state.  The village is located within Turner Township.

Geography

Demographics

2010 census
As of the census of 2010, there were 114 people, 43 households, and 32 families residing in the village. The racial makeup of the village was 95.6% White, 1.8% African American, and 2.6% from two or more races.

There were 43 households, of which 39.5% had children under the age of 18 living with them, 53.5% were married couples living together, 16.3% had a female householder with no husband present, 4.7% had a male householder with no wife present, and 25.6% were non-families. 18.6% of all households were made up of individuals, and 9.3% had someone living alone who was 65 years of age or older. The average household size was 2.65 and the average family size was 2.94.

The median age in the village was 42 years. 25.4% of residents were under the age of 18; 8% were between the ages of 18 and 24; 23.7% were from 25 to 44; 27.9% were from 45 to 64; and 14.9% were 65 years of age or older. The gender makeup of the village was 45.6% male and 54.4% female.

2000 census
As of the census of 2000, there were 139 people, 45 households, and 31 families residing in the village. The racial makeup of the village was 96.40% White, 1.44% Native American, and 2.16% from two or more races.

There were 45 households, out of which 53.3% had children under the age of 18 living with them, 55.6% were married couples living together, 11.1% had a female householder with no husband present, and 28.9% were non-families. 24.4% of all households were made up of individuals, and 13.3% had someone living alone who was 65 years of age or older. The average household size was 3.09 and the average family size was 3.63.

In the village, the population was spread out, with 38.8% under the age of 18, 7.9% from 18 to 24, 26.6% from 25 to 44, 15.1% from 45 to 64, and 11.5% who were 65 years of age or older. The median age was 28 years. For every 100 females, there were 107.5 males. For every 100 females age 18 and over, there were 84.8 males.

The median income for a household in the village was $22,813, and the median income for a family was $21,250. Males had a median income of $27,500 versus $23,750 for females. The per capita income for the village was $9,406. There were 38.5% of families and 34.6% of the population living below the poverty line, including 28.6% of under eighteens and 58.3% of those over 64.

References

Villages in Arenac County, Michigan
Villages in Michigan